SEAL Team is an American military drama television series created by Benjamin Cavell. The series is produced by CBS Studios, and began airing on CBS on September 27, 2017.

The series follows an elite unit of United States Navy SEALs portrayed by David Boreanaz, Max Thieriot, Jessica Paré, Neil Brown Jr., A. J. Buckley, and Toni Trucks. On May 9, 2019, CBS renewed the series for a third season, which premiered on October 2, 2019. In May 2020, the series was renewed for a fourth season which premiered on December 2, 2020. In May 2021, it was announced the series was renewed for a fifth season and would be moving to Paramount+. The fifth season premiered on October 10, 2021. In February 2022, the series was renewed for a sixth season which premiered on September 18, 2022. In January 2023, the series was renewed for a seventh season.

Overview
The series follows Bravo Team, a sub-unit of the United States Naval Special Warfare Development Group, the most elite unit of Navy SEALs, as they plan and undertake dangerous missions worldwide with little notice, and the burden placed on them and their families.

Episodes

Cast and characters

 David Boreanaz as Master Chief Special Warfare Operator Jason Hayes a.k.a. Bravo 1/1B, leader of a Navy SEAL team (Bravo Team) dealing with the recent loss of one of their own. 
 Max Thieriot as Special Warfare Operator First Class Clay Spenser a.k.a. Bravo 6/6B (seasons 1–6), a second-generation Navy SEAL in training for Tier One status who is questioned as to his readiness for combat.  He becomes a member of Bravo Team at the end of "The Exchange", and twice briefly served as the team's second-in-command. Clay died late in season 6, trying to help a veteran from killing himself. 
 Jessica Paré as Amanda "Mandy" Ellis (seasons 1–4; guest season 5 – present), Bravo Team's CIA liaison. Due to her actions of giving up the location of a CIA asset in "My Life for Yours", Mandy is demoted from her rank of officer and is now serving as an interrogator for the CIA.
 Neil Brown Jr. as Chief Warrant Officer 2 Raymond "Ray" Perry, formerly Senior Chief Special Warfare Operator, a.k.a. Mako One/1 or Bravo 2/2B, Jason's most trusted friend and the longest tenured member of the team. Ray is promoted to Chief Warrant Officer 2 in episode 3 of season 4.
 A. J. Buckley as Special Warfare Operator First Class Percival "Sonny" Quinn a.k.a. Bravo 3/3B, a loyal but sometimes volatile SEAL who is at his best in firefights and prefers them over a leadership position.
 Toni Trucks as Lieutenant (Junior Grade) Lisa Davis, formerly Logistics Specialist First Class, then Ensign. and, since season 3, a DEVGRU Intelligence Officer assigned primarily to Bravo Team.
 Judd Lormand as Commander, formerly Lieutenant Commander, Eric Blackburn (recurring season 1; main seasons 2–4; guest star season 4 – present), formerly Bravo Team's commanding officer, promoted to Executive Officer of DEVGRU during season 4.
 Raffi Barsoumian as Senior Chief Special Warfare Operator Omar Hamza (season 6), a SEAL for fifteen years and the son of Syrian immigrants. Omar has a deep understanding of the Middle East, and calls upon that knowledge to help navigate missions in the region.
 Note:

Production

Development 
Following the success of History Channel's Six, on January 27, 2017, it was announced that CBS had given the pilot order for another Navy SEAL project. The episode was written and authored by Benjamin Cavell who was expected to be an executive producer, alongside Ed Redlich, Sarah Timberman, Carl Beverly, Christopher Chulack. Production companies involved with the pilot include Chulack Productions, East 25 C, Timberman/Beverly Productions and CBS Television Studios. On May 12, 2017, CBS officially ordered the pilot to series. A few days later, it was announced that the series, now titled SEAL Team, would premiere by September 27, 2017, and air on Wednesdays at 9:00 P.M.

The series received a full-season order on October 12, 2017, bringing the first season to a total of 22 episodes. On March 27, 2018, CBS renewed the series for a second season which premiered on October 3, 2018. On May 22, 2018, it was reported that both Cavell and Redlich were exiting their roles as executive producer and showrunner, and John Glenn replacing him as showrunner. Spencer Hudnut replaced John Glenn as showrunner in 2019 after an internal probe by CBS that resulted in his dismissal and canceling of his overall deal. On May 6, 2020, CBS renewed the series for a fourth season, which premiered on December 2, 2020. On May 14, 2021, it was reported the series was undergoing talks to move to the streaming service Paramount+ if renewed for a fifth season; if a deal were reached, the series would air some of its fifth-season episodes on CBS before moving to Paramount+. Four days later, the deal was finalized. The fifth season premiered on October 10, 2021.

On February 1, 2022, Paramount+ renewed the series for a sixth season, which had premiered on September 18, 2022. On January 18, 2023, Paramount+ renewed the series for a seventh season.

Casting 
On March 14, 2017, it was announced that Jim Caviezel would topline CBS' then-untitled Navy SEAL drama pilot but on March 22, 2017, it was announced that David Boreanaz had been cast in the pilot's lead role of Jason, replacing Caviezel. On March 8, 2017, it was reported that A.J. Buckley would play Sonny. On August 15, 2018, it was reported that Judd Lormand had been upgraded to series regular for season 2. On August 8, 2018, it was announced that Michael McGrady and Ruffin Prentiss would recur as Captain Harrington and Summer Kairos in the series' second season. On July 10, 2019, it was reported that Jamie McShane and Rudy Dobrev were cast in recurring roles for the third season. On August 7, 2019, Emily Swallow was cast in a recurring capacity for the third season. On January 27, 2021, Shiva Negar joined the cast in a recurring role for the fourth season.

Authenticity 
From the beginning, the show has looked to former operators for their real-life experience to make the show as authentic as possible. Not only does the series have former Navy SEALs, like Mark Semos and Kenny Sheard in the writer's room, but over 70% of its crew are veterans, and almost the entire stunt team are former special operators. Tyler Gray who plays Trent is a former Delta Force operator. Veterans that have fought and served together in Iraq and Afghanistan will often reunite on the show.

Reception

Critical response
The review aggregator website Rotten Tomatoes reported an approval rating of 70% based on 23 reviews, with an average rating of 5.66/10. The site's critical consensus reads, "SEAL Team solidly written first season offers compelling characters and hints at broader potential, even if it's somewhat undermined by an overall sense of predictability." Metacritic, which uses a weighted average, assigned a score of 57 out of 100 based on 16 critics, indicating "mixed or average reviews".

Ratings

Note: The fourteenth episode of the first season and third-season finale aired out of their regular timeslots, at Wednesday 10 pm.

Accolades

Home media

See also 

 The Brave—Similar type of series but focused on a fictional Defense Intelligence Agency unit
 Six—Similar fictional hourly drama based on the Tier One SEAL team
 Strike Back—A British/American action-adventure/spy-drama television series follows actions of Section 20, a secretive branch of the British Defence Intelligence service
 Ultimate Force—Similar type of series but focused on the British Army's Special Air Service
 The Unit—Similar type of series but focused on the United States Army's Delta Force

Notes

References

External links
 
 
 

2010s American drama television series
2017 American television series debuts
2020s American drama television series
American action television series
American military television series
CBS original programming
English-language television shows
Paramount+ original programming
Television series by CBS Studios
Works about SEAL Team Six
Works about Mexican drug cartels
Television shows filmed in Belgrade
Television shows set in Serbia